The Frome Clay is a geological formation in England. It preserves fossils dating back to the Bathonian stage of the Middle Jurassic period.

See also 
 List of fossiliferous stratigraphic units in England

References 

Geologic formations of England
Jurassic System of Europe
Jurassic England
Bathonian Stage